Filadelfia is the capital of Boquerón Department in the Gran Chaco of western Paraguay. It is the centre of the Fernheim Colony. It is about a 5-hour drive from the capital of Asunción.

History
Filadelfia was founded in 1930 by Russian Mennonites who fled from the Soviet Union. Filadelfia lay near the front of the Chaco War, but was little affected.  It became divided in the Second World War, with some of the original German colonists supporting Germany and later being expelled. 

Filadelfia has developed into an important cattle herding settlement.

Infrastructure 
Today the town is home to a museum, a library, a radio station and a hospital. The museum displays objects from the town's Mennonite past, such as Russian overcoats, as well as the local wildlife, such as stuffed armadillos, anteaters, and toads. The colony's villages lie around Filadelfia, as do several native reserves, home to much of the area's native population, from the Chulupí, Lengua, Toba-Pilaga, Sanapaná and Ayoreo groups. A modern supermarket is located in the centre of the town, which is the last place to get groceries before heading farther out into the Chaco. Most of the town's potable water supply is drawn from underground cisterns, being replenished by intermittent rainfall; the underground water  is too salty to drink. It now serves as a place for visitors to camp for the night.

Transportation
The newly asphalted highway, PY09, from Asunción continues past Filadelfia for another  and runs out at the military checkpoint Mariscal Estigarribia. From this point onwards, the road to the border town fort General Eugenio A. Garay with Bolivia is almost impassable.

Notable residents
A distinguished Russian Mennonite writer and historian living in Filadelfia was Peter P. Klassen.
Former Canadian Minister of Public Safety Vic Toews was born in Filadelfia in 1952.

Notes

References 																
World Gazeteer: Paraguay

External links 

 Filadelfia (Fernheim Colony, Boquerón Department, Paraguay) at Global Anabaptist Mennonite Encyclopedia Online
The 'Green Hell' Becomes Home: Mennonites in Paraguay as Described in the Writings of Peter P. Klassen A review essay by Gerhard Reimer, Mennonite Quarterly Review 76, no. 4 (October 2002): 460–480.

Populated places in the Boquerón Department
Populated places established in 1930
Mennonitism in Paraguay
Russian Mennonite diaspora in South America